Eden Land is the second album from Australian artist Laura Jean.

Track listing
All tracks by Laura Jean

"Magic Unnamed / Eden Land" – 4:59 
"November" – 2:14 
"Lady Of The Lake" – 1:51 
"Yellow Moon" – 3:40
"Mikhael" – 2:45
"Love Is Going To Lead Us" – 4:31
"Anniversary" – 4:22
"Eve" – 3:44
"Adam" – 3:50

Personnel 
Laura Jean — vocals, guitar, piano, organ, recorder, bells, backing vocals
Biddy Connor — viola, backing vocals
Martin Mackerass — clarinet, backing vocals
Geoff Dunbar — bass, backing vocals
Jen Sholakis — drums, percussion, backing vocals

Additional personnel
Oliver Mann — backing vocals
Paddy Mann — backing vocals
Lehmann Smith — backing vocals
Liz Stringer — backing vocals
Mark Bradshaw — backing vocals
Lawrence John — backing vocals

2008 albums
Laura Jean albums